The electricity sector in Spain describes electricity in Spain. In 2008, Spain consumed 88% of the average electricity consumption for a European Union 15 country. In 2009, Spain exported about 3% of the electricity it produced. The volume of renewable electricity produced in 2009 was 5% greater than in 2004, and accounted for about 26% of the electricity consumption. The share of nuclear power declined notably between 2004 and 2005. The volume of nuclear power per person has declined consistently during 2004–2009.

Electricity per person and by power source 
In 2008, Spanish electricity consumption was an average of 6,523 kWh/person. Spanish electricity usage constituted 88% of the EU15 average (EU15: 7,409 kWh/person), and 73% of the OECD average (8,991 kWh/person).

Mode of production 

According to IEA the electricity use (gross production + imports − exports − transmission/distribution losses) in Spain was in 2004 253 TWh, (2007) 282 TWh and (2008) 288 TWh, while the use was in 2008 in France 494 TWh and Germany 587 TWh.

Electricity production from natural gas in 2008 was in Spain 122 TWh, exceeded in Europe only by Russia 495 TWh, United Kingdom 177 TWh and Italy 173 TWh.

Transmission 

Red Eléctrica de España operates around 20,000 km each of 400kV and 220kV power lines.

Spain is technically part of the Synchronous grid of Continental Europe. However, in 2014, Spain had an electricity interconnection level (international transmission capacity relative to production capacity) of 2% (below the recommended 10% level), effectively islanding the Iberian Peninsula. The 2 GW HVDC INELEF powerline between Spain and France was opened in 2015.

Renewable energy in Spain 

In 2009 Spain produced 13% wind power compare to the use of electricity (794/ 6,145) The wind capacity installed at end 2010 will, in a normal wind year, produce 14.4% of electricity, when the equivalent value for Germany is 9.4%, Portugal 14% and Denmark 24%.

Power stations

See also
 Energy in Spain

References